Roxarsone is an organoarsenic compound that has been used in poultry production as a feed additive to increase weight gain and improve feed efficiency, and as a coccidiostat. As of June 2011, it was approved for chicken feed in the United States, Canada, Australia, and 12 other countries. The drug was also approved in the United States and elsewhere for use in pigs.

Its use in the United States was voluntarily ended by the manufacturers in June 2011 and has been illegal since 2013. Its use was immediately suspended in Malaysia. It was banned in Canada in August 2011. In Australia, its use in chicken feed was discontinued in 2012. Roxarsone has been banned in the European Union since 1999.

Production and applications
Roxarsone is a derivative of phenylarsonic acid (C6H5As(O)(OH)2). It was first reported in a 1923 British patent that described the nitration and diazotization of arsanilic acid. When blended with calcite powder, it is used in poultry feed premixes in some parts of the world. Where available, it can be purchased in 5%, 20% and 50% concentrations.

Roxarsone was marketed as 3-Nitro by Zoetis, a former subsidiary of Pfizer now a publicly traded company. In 2006, approximately one million kilograms of roxarsone were produced in the U.S.

Marketing approval in the United States
Roxarsone is one of four arsenical animal drugs that had been approved by the U.S. Food and Drug Administration (FDA) for use in poultry and swine, along with nitarsone, arsanilic acid, and carbarsone. In September 2013, the FDA announced that Zoetis and Fleming Laboratories would voluntarily withdraw current roxarsone, arsanilic acid, and carbarsone approvals, leaving only nitarsone approvals in place. In 2015, the FDA withdrew the approval of using nitarsone in animal feeds. The ban came into effect at the end of 2015.

Controversy
Roxarsone has attracted attention as a source of arsenic contamination of poultry and other foods. In June 2011, the manufacturers suspended sales of roxarsone in the U.S. and Canada in response to a study by the Food and Drug Administration (FDA). The FDA found that roxarsone use was associated with elevated levels of inorganic arsenic in chicken livers. An FDA press release stated that the findings raised "concerns of a very low but completely avoidable exposure to a carcinogen."

A 2013 market basket study conducted in the United States linked the use of roxarsone and other arsenical feed additives to increased levels of inorganic arsenic in chicken breast meat, albeit at concentrations well below danger levels set in federal safety standards. Breast meat from chickens exposed to arsenical feed additives contained inorganic arsenic at the level of about two parts per billion. Organic chickens not exposed to arsenical feed additives contained about half a part per billion. Federal standards permitted concentrations of 500 parts per billion of total arsenic. The study was performed on chickens raised prior to the voluntary withdrawal of Roxarsone from the market by its manufacturer in June 2011.

References

Further reading

External links
 No Arsenic In Pardoned Turkeys, But It Might Be In Yours at NPR

Arsonic acids
Phenols
Nitrobenzenes
Antiprotozoal agents
Veterinary drugs
Food safety
Medicated feed